Brenthia entoma is a species of moth of the family Choreutidae. It was described by Alexey Diakonoff in 1982. It is found in Sri Lanka.

Description
The wingspan of the adult male is 8 mm. The head and thorax are glossy fuscous. Palpus moderately long and gray fuscous. Antenna black. Abdomen fuscous bronze with a black anal tuft. Forewings dark fuscous bronze. Costa with a fuscous-black suffusion. A white patch found at one-third of the costa and a small wedge-shaped white mark found at four-fifths of the costa. A wedge-shaped mark is continued across the wings towards the dorsum by a slender white line. One metallic-violet dot and two violet dots are found on the forewings. Cilia fuscous. Hindwing dark fuscous bronze. Cilia dark fuscous.

References

Brenthia
Moths described in 1982
Moths of Sri Lanka
Taxa named by Alexey Diakonoff